Gisela Necker (1932 - 2011) was an early lesbian activist active in Berlin from the 1970s until her death. She was a leading member of Homosexual Action West Berlin (HAW), co-founding its first lesbian group in the early 1970s. She later helped to found the Berlin women's centre and the Lesbian Action Centre. She died in Berlin at the age of 78.

Early life 
Gisela was born in eastern Germany growing up in the area that later became the German Democratic Republic. She was orphaned and trained to be a teacher at a young age, gaining her first teaching post at the age of 18. She moved to the West Germany in 1959 when she realised that the East and West Germany border would close.

Activism 
Living in Berlin and socialising in its homesexual and lesbian sector lead her to form the first lesbian section of HAW. In 1974 the group chose to archive the documents relevant to their activities, for example, posters and flyers and formed the archive Spinnboden. Gisela was also a founder of the Berlin women's centre and the Lesbian Action Centre.

References

1932 births
2011 deaths
German LGBT rights activists
German lesbians